Brusdalsvatnet is a large lake on the island of Oksenøya in Møre og Romsdal county, Norway. The lake sits on the border between Ålesund Municipality and Skodje Municipality. The lake is a reservoir that is the water supply for the nearby city of Ålesund.

See also
List of lakes in Norway

References

Ålesund
Lakes of Møre og Romsdal